is the debut extended play of Japanese singer Shouta Aoi and the first physical release under his new stage name from when he entered voice acting. The album was released on June 26, 2013 and compiles songs from Aoi's work with Broccoli. The album was produced by Elements Garden.

Background and release
Blue Bird is the debut mini album of Shouta Aoi and the first album release under his new stage name from when he entered voice acting. The album was released under Broccoli's music label, B-green, on June 26, 2013.

Aoi selected the name Blue Bird for his album, which was meant to picture "flying" and "sending feelings" over to his fans and people who supported him over the years. He opted for a "simple" and "elegant" shot for the album's cover, which features him against a black background with lighting against him. The image itself was meant as a direct contrast to Aoi's typically "soft" image.

Composition

Aoi worked with Elements Garden while recording the album's title track, "Blue Bird", mentioning that it was difficult for him to record. "Blue Bird" was the image of a "bluebird of happiness" and was a song meant for the fans who supported him. The lyrics for the album's tracks took longer than the song's composition.

The album compiles songs he worked on for Broccoli's drama CD series, as well as some original songs. "Ai no Sasameki Goto" was the theme song for the drama CD series Sangokushi Lovers and was the first song he released as Shouta Aoi. "Gekka no Hana" was the theme song for the drama CD series Ikemen Ooku.

Reception

The album debuted at #20 in the Oricon Weekly Albums Chart and charted for 4 weeks.

Track listing

Charts

References

2013 albums
Shouta Aoi albums